Carrickfergus Waterfront is an area of Carrickfergus situated on the north shore of Belfast Lough, which includes two harbour facilities, several restaurants and bars and promenade areas.

The waterfront area is mainly composed of two harbour facilities, a harbour and a marina. Both harbours feature rugged rubble stone breakwaters, absorbing energy from heavy swells.

Carrickfergus Harbour

The harbour is a 12th-century Norman harbour, made during the construction of Carrickfergus Castle, built in 1127. It is split into two sections, the larger section being closer to the mouth of the harbour and the smaller inner section being used primarily for less frequently used boats, and featuring a slipway. The promenade from the castle grounds to the other side of the harbour was refurbished during 2008/2009 along with the promenade along the Marine Highway.

The harbour features a 258-metre quay which is a popular area for fishing and short leisurely walks (especially in the case of tourists to the town).

Carrickfergus Marina

200 metres west of the harbour is Carrickfergus Marina, a purpose-built marina basin opened in 1985.

It provides 300 berths, is professionally supervised and offers individual access to water and electricity. Fuel services are at hand and the complex also provides lifting equipment.

The Marina is located in a hub of activity close to a modern complex accommodating restaurants, a children's play facility/park, a six-screen cinema, a Sainsbury's supermarket, a sailing club and The Windrose - a popular bar/restaurant overlooking the marina.

During 2004/2005 the "Harbour Point" was built in the area between the harbour and marina. The building features a restaurant as well as a bar/lounge on the ground floor and a popular nightclub on the floor above. In the same time period several other establishments were built surrounding the harbour, including Brewer's Fayre, a family restaurant specialising in seafood, and a Premier Inn.

References 

Marinas in Northern Ireland
Carrickfergus
County Antrim